Bryce B. Robins (born 19 September 1980) is a New Zealand-born Japanese rugby union player who plays as a centre for the Munakata Sanix Blues in the Top League and Japan. He played for the Hurricanes in 2002 and 2003.

On 22 April 2007, Robins made his international debut for Japan against Korea where they won 82–0. Robin was named as part of the Japan squad for the 2007 Rugby World Cup by coach John Kirwan.

In 2003 he also made the New Zealand Māori team to play Tonga, England and Canada, scoring a try in his sole start playing at second five-eighth in their win against the Canadian All Stars.

Robins is the son of 1985 All Black Bryce Robins, a wing who toured with the All Blacks to Argentina in 1985 after initially being selected for the aborted tour of South Africa earlier the same year.

References

1980 births
Living people
Japan international rugby union players
New Zealand expatriate rugby union players
Expatriate rugby union players in Japan
New Zealand expatriate sportspeople in Japan
Rugby union players from New Plymouth
Hurricanes (rugby union) players
Black Rams Tokyo players
Green Rockets Tokatsu players
Mie Honda Heat players
Munakata Sanix Blues players
Māori All Blacks players
Rugby union centres